A Unified Social Credit Identifier is issued to registered companies and other types of organization by the Chinese government. It is "unified" in the sense that it is used both as the business registration number with the State Administration for Market Regulation (SAMR) and as the taxpayer identifier with the State Taxation Administration (STA). These identifiers are now used widely as the only organization id within and outside of the government. An identifier must be obtained before one can operate a business in China.

History
Previously, business owners in China had to obtain a business permit with a unique id from the State Administration for Industry and Commerce (SAIC), a taxpayer identifier from the STA, and an organization code from Administration of Quality Supervision, Inspection and Quarantine (AQSIQ) until the reforms in 2015 introduced the USCC. SAIC and AQSIQ were merged into the newly founded SAMR following an organizational reform by the State Council in 2018.

References

Taxation in China
National identification numbers